Located in Toulouse in France, École nationale de la météorologie (ENM, French Meteorology University) is a renowned Graduate Engineering school in meteorology, with roots back to 1948 as the École de la météorologie.
It is one of the grandes écoles. The university has its own campus and an annexe at the École nationale de l'aviation civile campus for the aviation related subjects.

Its different curricula lead to the following French & European degrees :
 Ingénieur ENM (ENM Graduate engineer Masters level program) ;
 Technician in meteorology degree ;
 Master of Science degree in climatology;
 Mastère Spécialisé degree.

Academic activities and industrial applied research are performed mainly in French language. Students from a dozen of nationalities participate to the different curricula at École nationale de la météorologie.

Most of the 350 graduate engineer students at ENM live in dedicated residential buildings nearby research labs and metro public transports.

References

External links

 Official

Engineering universities and colleges in France
Ecole nationale de la meteorologie
Education in Toulouse
Educational institutions established in 1948
1948 establishments in France
Toulouse Institute of Technology
University of Toulouse
Meteorology and climate education
Météo-France